Lantau Peak or Fung Wong Shan (literally "Phoenix Mountain") is the second highest peak in Hong Kong and the highest point on Lantau Island, with a height of  above sea level.

Name origin
The mountain is actually made up of a pair of peaks, one is known as "Fung Shan" (male phoenix mountain) and the other is "Wong Shan" (female phoenix mountain), together they form "Fung Wong Shan".

Location 

Lantau Peak is located near the center of Lantau Island, west of Sunset Peak, and within Lantau South Country Park.  It is reachable by the Lantau Trail. At the foot of Lantau Peak, a tourist spot called the Wisdom Path can be found.

Geology 
Lantau Peak is formed by Volcanic rocks, including porphyritic rhyolites, like many of the tallest mountains in Hong Kong, such as Tai Mo Shan. Some shorter mountains in Hong Kong are formed by older Granitic rocks.

Lantau Peak is also the source of water for Tung Chung River, a major river on Lantau Island.

Climate 
Lantau Peak is located in central Lantau Island, with an elevation of 934 meters above sea level (23 metres shorter than Tai Mo Shan, Hong Kong's highest peak). Under the Köppen climate classification, Lantau Peak features a subtropical highland climate. Due to its elevation, strong winds and fog occur throughout the year. Winter is cold with temperatures often dipping below 0 °C; summer is warm with temperatures reaching tops of 18-22 °C; spring is cool and humid; autumn is cool and dry. Because there is no weather station at the top of Lantau Peak (934m), the Ngong Ping Weather Station of the Hong Kong Observatory (593m) can be used as reference for the temperature at the summit.

See also

 List of mountains, peaks and hills in Hong Kong
Sunset Peak
Yi Tung Shan

References

Lantau Island
Mountains, peaks and hills of Hong Kong